Domenico Tedesco (born 12 September 1985) is an Italian-German football manager who is currently the head coach of the Belgium national team.

In 2017, he took over as manager of Schalke 04 and guided them to a second place finish in the Bundesliga in his debut season. He was sacked in March 2019 and subsequently took charge of Spartak Moscow in the Russian league in October 2019. He left Spartak in June 2021 before being appointed at RB Leipzig in December, leading them to win the 2022 DFB-Pokal. He was sacked by Leipzig in September 2022. In February 2023, he was appointed as the coach of Belgium on a contract through to UEFA Euro 2024.

Career

Beginnings in youth teams
When Tedesco was two years old, his family emigrated from the Italian province of Cosenza to Germany and settled in the district of Esslingen in Baden-Württemberg. Tedesco and his younger brother later acquired German citizenship. As a player, he was active for ASV Aichwald in the Kreisliga A.

On 1 July 2008, Tedesco began to work in the youth department of VfB Stuttgart as an assistant coach under Thomas Schneider. From 2013 onwards he was assistant coach of the under-17 team before being promoted to head coach during the course of the season. At the end of the 2014–15 season, he left Stuttgart to become youth manager for 1899 Hoffenheim. He was promoted to under-19 coach ahead of the 2016–17 season. He graduated from the Hennes-Weisweiler-Akademie, Germany's football coaching academy, as the top student of the class of 2016.

Erzgebirge Aue
On 8 March 2017, the then last-placed team of 2016–17 2. Bundesliga Erzgebirge Aue appointed Tedesco as their new head coach. He earned 13 points from his first five matches and ended the season in 14th place, sparing the club from relegation. He finished with a record of six wins, two draws, and three losses.

Schalke 04
Starting with the 2017–18 season, Tedesco took over the managerial spot for Bundesliga side Schalke 04. He inked a two-year deal with the Royal Blues on 9 June 2017.

On 25 November 2017, Tedesco's side went 4–0 down at half time against rivals Borussia Dortmund. Schalke eventually drew 4–4 in a historic Revierderby, earning him Bundesliga's Man of Matchday 13, the first manager to ever win the award.

He guided Schalke to a second-place finish in the Bundesliga in his first season in charge of the club.

After a 0–7 defeat against Manchester City in the Champions League round of 16 and seven winless games in a row, Tedesco was sacked on 14 March 2019.

Spartak Moscow
On 14 October 2019, the Russian club Spartak Moscow appointed Tedesco as their new head coach. He signed a contract that ran until June 2021. 

Throughout his tenure he generally kept Spartak at the top of the league table, gaining popularity amongst the fans, not only for his performance as manager, but also because of his emotional, charismatic and outgoing character. 

On 16 December 2020, he announced that he will not extend his contract with Spartak after June 2021, the originally agreed date, due the impacts of the COVID-19 pandemic on the time he is able to spend with his family. 

In a highly emotional final game, in which Spartak needed to either draw or win against FC Akhmat Grozny to remain in second place and reach the Champions League third qualifying round, the final score was 2–2. This was despite Tedesco's team being 2–0 down at half-time.

RB Leipzig
On 9 December 2021, Tedesco took over the head coach position at RB Leipzig. In the 2021–22 UEFA Europa League, RB Leipzig reached the semi-finals, in which they were eliminated by Rangers 3–2 on aggregate. On 21 May 2022, he led RB Leipzig to win the DFB-Pokal Final 4–2 on penalties against SC Freiburg.

Despite the successful first season, the 2022–23 season started with several disappointing results, and he was fired on 7 September 2022 after a 4–1 home Champions League loss to Shakhtar Donetsk.

Belgium
Tedesco was appointed manager of the Belgium national team on 8 February 2023, on a contract due to run until the end of UEFA Euro 2024.

Personal life
Born in Rossano, Italy, Tedesco's parents emigrated to Esslingen, Germany, when he was two years old. Coincidentally, his last name, Tedesco, means "German" in Italian. After completing his vocational training as a wholesale merchant, he obtained a bachelor's degree in business engineering and a master's in innovation management. He holds dual German-Italian citizenship.

Managerial record

Honours
RB Leipzig
 DFB-Pokal: 2021–22

References

1985 births
Living people
People from Rossano
People from Esslingen (district)
German football managers
Italian football managers
German people of Calabrian descent
Bundesliga managers
2. Bundesliga managers
FC Erzgebirge Aue managers
FC Schalke 04 managers
RB Leipzig managers
Italian emigrants to Germany
Naturalized citizens of Germany
FC Spartak Moscow managers
Russian Premier League managers
German expatriate football managers
Italian expatriate football managers
Expatriate football managers in Russia
German expatriate sportspeople in Russia
Italian expatriate sportspeople in Russia
Belgium national football team managers
German expatriate sportspeople in Belgium
Italian expatriate sportspeople in Belgium